Montross may refer to:

Montross, Virginia, town in Westmoreland County, Virginia, United States

People with the surname
Christine Montross (born 1973), American psychiatrist and writer
Eric Montross (born 1971), American basketball player
Lynn Montross (1895–1961), American historian

See also
Montrose (disambiguation)
Mont Ross, stratovolcano in the Kerguelen Islands
Matross